The 1969 San Francisco 49ers season was the franchise's 20th season in the National Football League and their 24th overall.

Offseason

NFL Draft

Roster

Regular season

Schedule

Standings

Season summary

Week 10 

NFL Films selected this matchup as the Game of the Week.

Awards, records, and honors

References

External links 
 1969 49ers on Pro Football Reference
 49ers Schedule on jt-sw.com

San Francisco 49ers seasons
San Francisco 49ers
San Fran